El Mek Nimr, also known as Nimr Muhammad, (c. 1785 to 1846) was the last mek (king) of the Ja'alin tribe, who resided in Shendi, Sudan. After first having joined the Egyptian army during the Turkish rule in Sudan, he later defeated their troops and finally went into exile.

Egyptian expedition 

During the Egyptian invasion of Sudan, Nimr was forced to accept the Egyptian-Turkish rule by submitting to Isma'il Kamil Pasha's army on 28 March 1821. He also joined Isma'il's campaign against the Sennar sultanate.

After this campaign, Isma'il retired to Shendi, but paid the sixty year-old Mek Nimr no courtesy. When he demanded a tribute of slaves and money, Nimr refused. This led to a confrontation, in which Isma'il struck the king. A few hours later, Nimr attacked Isma'il's camp, setting it ablaze and burning Isma'il with it. Nimr also had all Egyptian forces killed and ambushed their cavalry that arrived two days later.

Later, Isma'il's successor, Defterdar Muhammad Bey Khusraw led a revenge campaign on the Ja'alin. Many of them, including Mek Nimr, had to go into exile.

Recognition 
A street in downtown Khartoum is named after him, leading up to El Mek Nimr Bridge since its opening in 2007.

References

Sources 
 
 
 

African kings
1846 deaths
History of Sudan